The 2017–18 CSA Women's Provincial League was the 23rd edition of South Africa's provincial one-day cricket tournament. It ran from October 2017 to April 2018, with 16 provincial teams taking part. Western Province beat Gauteng in the final to win their eighth one-day title.

Competition format
The 16 teams were divided into three divisions: a top division named "Top 6", and two lower divisions, Pools A and B. Teams played each other team in their group once in a round-robin format, with matches played using a one day format with 50 overs per side.

All six teams in the Top 6 group progressed to a further round of groups, joined by the winners of Pools A and B. The eight teams were divided into two groups, playing each other team in their group once. The top four teams from this stage progressed to the semi-finals, whilst the bottom four teams played in a series of placing matches. The top six placed sides in these matches qualified for the next season's Top 6 league.

The tournament ran concurrently with the 2017–18 CSA Women's Provincial T20 Competition, with matches played either the day before or day after the corresponding encounter between two teams in the T20 tournament. To maintain this link for the following season, promotion and relegation in the Provincial T20 Competition was determined by standings in the Provincial League.

The groups worked on a points system with positions being based on the total points. Points were awarded as follows:

Win: 4 points 
Tie: 3 points 
Loss: 0 points.
Abandoned/No Result: 2 points.
Bonus Point: 1 bonus point available per match.

Teams

Group stages

First round

Top 6

Pool A

Pool B

 Advanced to the second round group stages, joining the Top 6 teams

Second round

Week Pool A

Week Pool B

 Advanced to the semi-finals

Knockout stages

Semi-finals

Final

Final placings
In addition to the semi-finals and final, a number of placing matches took place at the University of the Free State on 7 and 8 April 2018. The top six finishers qualified for the Top 6 league in the following season's tournament. Both the third and fifth-place play-offs were abandoned due to rain. Final placings of the top eight teams were as follows:

References

CSA Women's Provincial Programme
Domestic cricket competitions in 2017–18
2017–18 South African cricket season
2017 in South African women's sport
2018 in South African women's sport